Hong Joon-ho (born 11 October 1993) is a South Korean footballer who plays as centre back for FC Seoul in K League 1.

Club career
He joined K League 1 side Gwangju FC in January 2016.

He joined K League 1 side FC Seoul in February 2021

References

External links 

1993 births
Living people
Association football defenders
South Korean footballers
Gwangju FC players
Ulsan Hyundai FC players
FC Seoul players
K League 1 players
K League 2 players